Mairia petiolata is a tufted, variably hairy, perennial plant of up to  assigned to the family Asteraceae. It mostly has two flower heads at the tip of the branches of each erect, dark reddish brown scape. The flower heads have a bell- to cup-shaped involucre that consists of 20–24, purplish, overlapping bracts in 3–4 whorls. These protect 12–16 pink, ray florets, surrounding many yellow disc florets. This species was only seen flowering once, in December. It is known from one location in the Langeberg, Western Cape province of South Africa.

Taxonomy 
This species of fire daisy was first recognised by Ulrike Zinnecker-Wiegand in 2011. She named it Mairia petiolata, based on a specimen collected by South African botanist Elsie Elizabeth Esterhuysen at Misty Point on Goedgeloof Peak, in the Swellendam District, Western Cape province of South Africa in 1979.

Description
They are slender, often washed dark purple-red, always densely set with white woolly hairs on the inner axils, and the remainder of the surface white woolly, eventually or even very young hairless. The tip is mostly sharply, rarely bluntly pointy, the base tapering gradually to a point (or attenuate), the margin with coarse and irregular teeth, perhaps somewhat lobed, seldom almost entire, rolled down. On the underside a netted structure of veins is visible but on the upper surface, only a single main vein can be distinguished. The leaves are often coloured dark red, both surfaces may be hairless or set with few or many short woolly hairs, but the leaf surfaces are always visible through the indumentum.

There are between twenty and twenty four overlapping bracts arranged in three to four whorls, occasionally with white woolly hairs and some glands on the surface, each of which is tinged dark red-violet or purplish but green in the middle, narrowly oval to narrowly inverted egg-shaped, with papery margins set with a dense, regular row of equally long hairs.

From the mouth of the ray floret tubes extends a tube consisting of five infertile staminodes, through which a forked style grows. The tube nearer the base is glandular hairy in its lower half, the five lobes at the top are distinctly upright, loosely glandular hairy and have resin ducts along their margins. Sticking out of the center of each disc floret corolla are five anthers of 1 mm (0.06 in) long with triangular appendages at their tips, that are merged into a tube, through which the style grows when the floret opens, hoovering up the pollen on its shaft. The styles are dark red and exert far beyond the mouth of the florets. Surrounding the base of the corolla of both ray- and disc florets are two whorls of pappus.

Differences with other Mairia species 
Mairia petiolata has leaves with particularly coarse and irregular teeth along the margin, a distinct pattern of netted veins on the underside, and slender leaf stalks. It also has relatively graceful and elegant flower heads at the top of long, slender, mostly branched stalks. The involucral bracts have dark red margins, the disc florets are longer than the pappus and the dark red styles extend far beyond the mouth of the florets.

Distribution and conservation  
Mairia petiolata is known from only one location in the Langeberg, just to the north of Swellendam. Here it grows among a fynbos vegetation on sandstone slopes above . It is considered critically rare because this one population is stable and does not seem to be under thread.

References 

petiolata
Endemic flora of South Africa
Plants described in 2011